Padovani is a surname. Notable people with the surname include:

Aurelio Padovani (1889–1926), Italian politician
Edoardo Padovani (born 1993), Italian rugby union player
Gigi Padovani (born 1953), Italian journalist
Giovanni Padovani (c. 1512-?), Italian mathematician and astronomer
Henry Padovani (born 1952), French musician
Jean-Daniel Padovani (born 1980), French footballer
Lea Padovani (1920–1991), Italian actress
Romain Padovani (born 1989), French footballer
Jacqueline Padovani Grima, Maltese judge

See also
Padua